Rasassination is the second album by rapper Ras Kass. It was released on September 22, 1998 by PatchWerk. It peaked at #63 on Billboard 200 and #11 on the Top R&B/Hip-Hop Albums. One charting single was released "Ghetto Fabulous" featuring Dr. Dre and Mack 10. The album is no longer in print. "Interview with a Vampire" is considered an underground classic and one of his best songs.

Track listing

Samples
Conceited Bastard
"La Di Da Di" by Doug E. Fresh & Slick Rick
"The Most Beautifullest Thing in This World" by Keith Murray
Ghetto Fabulous
"Kiev Evening" by 101 Strings
"Trans-Europe Express" by Kraftwerk
"Deja Vu (Uptown Baby)" by Lord Tariq & Peter Gunz
I Ain't Fuckin' With You
"Fat Albert Creativity" by John Bradley and Bill Cosby
"Slam" by Onyx
Ice Age
"Hail Mary" by 2Pac
It Is What It Is
"If You Were Here Tonight" by Alexander O'Neal
Lapdance
"Do You Love What You Feel" by Rufus & Chaka Khan
OohWee!
"Mr. Groove" by One Way
Rassassination
"Shaft in Africa" by Johnny Pate
The End
"Nighttime" by Oliver Sain
Wild Pitch
"Books and Basketball (Montage)" by Billy Preston & Syreeta
H2O Proof
"Also sprach Zarathustra" by Richard Strauss
"Soul on Ice Remix" by Ras Kass
"You Make Me Wanna" by Usher

Charts

References

1998 albums
Ras Kass albums
Albums produced by Easy Mo Bee
Priority Records albums